is a Japanese male table tennis player. He is the gold medalist at the 2010 Youth Olympics and he won the World Junior Table Tennis Championships in 2010 (doubles) and 2011 (singles).

On 21 April 2012, he defeated Ma Long of China, World Rank no 1, to become the first player to be qualified for 2012 Olympics from the Asian Olympic Qualifiers.

Since 2012 he has been playing for the German Team TTC matec Frickenhausen.

He won the 2014 Russian Open singles title.

Career

Junior career 
Niwa had a prolific junior career beginning in 2008. He reached the quarter-finals at the 2008 India Junior Open in Pune, India, and won the doubles title with his partner Yuki Hirano. At the 2008 World Junior Championships in Madrid, Spain, he partnered with Kenta Matsudaira to reach the semi-finals. The following year, Niwa partnered with Asuka Machi to win the 2009 ITTF Cadet Challenge and ITTF Junior Circuit Finals in Tokyo, Japan.

At the 2009 World Junior Table Tennis Championships, Niwa reached the quarterfinals in the men's singles event before being defeated by Lin Gaoyuan.
Niwa qualified for the 2009 World Table Tennis Championships in Yokohama, Japan by defeating Josef Simoncik in the qualification tournament. Niwa reached the round of 64 before being defeated by Germany's Dimitrij Ovtcharov.

At the 2010 Singapore Youth Olympics, he won a gold medal in the Boys' Singles Event, and a gold medal partnering Ayuka Tanioka in the Mixed team event.
Niwa won the U21 title at the 2011 Dortmund Pro Tour German Open by defeating Kim Min-seok. At the 2011 Incheon Pro Tour Korea Open, he defeated Jeoung Young-sik to obtain his second U21 title that year. At the 2011 Manama World Junior Table Tennis Championships, he won the gold medal in the men's singles event, defeating Lin Gaoyuan of China.

2012: Breakthrough 
By 2012, the 17-year-old world junior champion was gaining widespread attention.  His breakthrough came at the 2012 Asian Olympic Qualification Tournament where he overcame world ranked No. 1 Ma Long and became the inaugural Asian player in the sport to qualify for the Olympics. Partnering with Kenta Matsudaira, Niwa overcame the Chinese pair of Wang Hao and Zhou Yu to win the 2012 World Tour Polish Open doubles title.

2013 
Niwa qualified for the 2013 World Table Tennis Championships seeded 15. He reached the fourth round in the men's singles event before being defeated by Ma Long. He partnered Kenta Matsudaira in the doubles event and reached the third round before losing to compatriots Jun Mizutani and Seiya Kishikawa. 
At the 2013 World Tour Japan Open in Yokohama, the Niwa/Matsudaira pair lost in the finals against compatriots Jin Ueda and Maharu Yoshimura.

2014: First ITTF World Tour Title 
At the 2014 World Team Table Tennis Championships in Tokyo, Niwa won 4 out of his 5 matches, contributing to Team Japan's bronze medal. At the 2014 World Tour Grand Finals in Bangkok, the Niwa/Matsudaira pair lost in the final to Korean pair Cho Eonrae and Seo Hyundeok.
Niwa won the 2014 World Tour Russian Open title in the men's singles event, defeating England's Paul Drinkhall in the final. The Niwa/Matsudaira pair competed in the semi-finals and were defeated by the Russian pair Fedor Kuzmin and Grigory Vlasov.

2015 
At the 2015 World Table Tennis Championships, Niwa reached the 4th round before being defeated by China's Fan Zhendong. In the doubles event, the Niwa/Matsudaira pair reached the semi-finals, and were defeated by Fan Zhendong and Zhou Yu. This was the last international partnership with Kenta Matsudaira.

2016 
At the 2016 World Team Table Tennis Championships in Kuala Lampur, Niwa contributed to Team Japan's success in winning the silver medal.  The team lost to Team China in the final.
Niwa represented Japan at the 2016 Summer Olympics in the men's singles event.  He reached the quarterfinals before being defeated by eventual silver medalist Zhang Jike. In the Men's team event, Niwa contributed to team Japan's first silver medal in the category. However, Niwa expressed discontentment with his performance, not winning any singles matches.

2017 
Niwa began the year by winning a bronze medal at the 2017 ITTF Asian Championships in Wuxi, China.  In the quarterfinals, he defeated world ranked #3 Xu Xin, but lost to Korea's Jeong Sangeun in the semi-finals.
At the 2017 World Table Tennis Championships, Niwa partnered with Maharu Yoshimura to win the bronze medal.  The Niwa/Yoshimura pair reached the semi-finals where they lost to Chinese pairing and eventual champions Fan Zhendong and Xu Xin in the men's singles event, he reached the quarter finals, defeating Dimitrij Ovtcharov in the fourth round, and losing to Fan Zhendong in the quarterfinals.
At the 2017 World Tour Japan Open, the Niwa/Yoshimura pair reached the finals of the men's doubles event where they lost to the Chinese pairing of Ma Long and Xu Xin.

2021 
In March, Niwa played in the WTT Star Contender event at WTT Doha, but he had an early round of 32 exit to Gustavo Tsuboi.

Niwa played in the singles and team event of the 2020 Summer Olympics. Niwa beat Wang Yang in the round of 32 but lost to Dimitrij Ovtcharov in the round of 16 in the men's singles event at the Tokyo Olympics. In the team event, Japan beat Australia in the round of 16. In the quarterfinals, Niwa upset Mattias Falck to lead to Japan's victory over Sweden. In the semifinals, Japan lost to Germany but won the bronze medal after beating South Korea.

Retirement 
Niwa retired from international competition in November 2022 stating that he wanted to "pass the baton on to the next generation and support them" but will continue to actively compete within Japan.

Doubles Partners

Niwa / Matsudaira 
Niwa and Kenta Matsudaira were doubles partners from 2008 to 2015.  Their playstyle is characterized by both players' unorthodox playstyles, with Niwa frequently incorporating "chiquita" banana flicks and Matsudaira frequently using his tomahawk service. Both players frequently use their backhand to win points.

The pair first competed in the international scene at the 2008 Cetniewo Polish Youth Open.  In 2012, they defeated the Chinese pairing of Wang/Zhou to secure their first men's doubles titles in the ITTF world tour scene. The pair won a bronze medal at the 2015 World Table Tennis Championships.  Niwa and Matsudaira have not partnered on the international scene since 2015.

Niwa / Yoshimura 
Niwa and Maharu Yoshimura have been frequent doubles partners starting in 2016.  The pairing first rose to prominence at the 2016 Summer Olympics Men's Team Event where the pair contributed to Japan's silver medal. At the 2017 Asian Championships in Wuxi, the pair reached the semifinals before losing to Fan Zhendong/Lin Gaoyuan. At the 2017 World Table Tennis Championships Men's Doubles event, the pair won a joint bronze medal. The following month, at the 2017 World Tour Japan Open, Niwa/Yoshimura reached the finals before losing to Ma Long/Xu Xin in three straight games.

Niwa / Mizutani 
Koki Niwa and Jun Mizutani are expected to play doubles in the team event (alongside Tomokazu Harimoto as the ace player) at the Tokyo Olympics in 2021. Mizutani noted the uniqueness of having a doubles pair with two left-handed players and stated that their objective was to make the match as un-normal as possible.

Rivalries

Niwa vs. Chen Chien-an 
Niwa and Chen have met 9 times in the international scene, with Niwa leading 5-4. Their first encounter was at the 2009 Harmony China Open where Niwa won 4 games to 1. They met another two times at the 2011 Harmony China Open where Chen defeated Niwa in the U21 Men's singles final, and Niwa defeated Chen in the Men's singles main bracket. In their most recent encounter, Chen won 4 games to 2 over Niwa at the 2017 Asian Cup main tournament bracket, and Niwa won 3 games to 0 in the group stage.

Niwa vs. Kim Min-seok 
Niwa and Kim have met 10 times with Niwa leading 6-4. Their first encounter was at the 2009 Korea Open U21 Men's singles event where Niwa won in full games. Niwa and Kim have met 3 times in the semi-final stages of U21 pro tour events. At the 2011 Pro Tour Germany Open U21 Men's singles final, Niwa won in full games over Kim.  Their most recent encounter was in 2015 where Niwa won 4 games to 1 at the 2015 World Tour China Open.

Career statistics

ITTF Major tournament performance timeline 

(W) Won; (F) finalist; (SF) semifinalist; (QF) quarterfinalist; (#R) rounds 4, 3, 2, 1; (RR) round-robin stage; (S) Singles Tournament; (D) Doubles Tournament; (MD) Mixed Doubles Tournament; (T) Team Tournament.

ITTF Career Singles Finals: 1

ITTF Career Doubles Finals: 10

ITTF Junior & U21 Singles Titles: 8

ITTF Junior & U21 Doubles Titles: 5

Record against top-10 players 
Niwa's match record against those who have been ranked in the top 10, with those who have been No. 1 in bold:
  Dimitrij Ovtcharov: 1–5
  Fan Zhendong: 0–6
  Timo Boll: 0–2
  Lin Gaoyuan: 2–3
  Xu Xin: 2–1
  Ma Long: 1–6
  Wong Chun Ting: 1–1
  Simon Gauzy: 2–1
  Kenta Matsudaira: 2–2
  Jun Mizutani: 1–1
  Tomokazu Harimoto: 2–2
  Lee Sang-su: 4–1
  Jeoung Young-sik: 3–1
  Joo Sae-hyuk: 0–1
  Marcos Freitas: 3–2
  Chuang Chih-yuan: 0–7
  Fang Bo: 0–1
  Vladimir Samsonov: 0–1 
  Zhang Jike: 1–2
  Gao Ning: 3–1
  Yan An: 1–3

Wins over top 10 players

References

External links

Koki Niwa at Table Tennis Media

1994 births
Living people
Japanese male table tennis players
Asian Games medalists in table tennis
Table tennis players at the 2012 Summer Olympics
Table tennis players at the 2016 Summer Olympics
Table tennis players at the 2020 Summer Olympics
Olympic table tennis players of Japan
Olympic medalists in table tennis
Olympic silver medalists for Japan
Olympic bronze medalists for Japan
Medalists at the 2016 Summer Olympics
Medalists at the 2020 Summer Olympics
Table tennis players at the 2010 Summer Youth Olympics
Table tennis players at the 2010 Asian Games
Table tennis players at the 2014 Asian Games
Asian Games bronze medalists for Japan
Medalists at the 2010 Asian Games
Medalists at the 2014 Asian Games
Sportspeople from Hokkaido
People from Tomakomai, Hokkaido
Universiade medalists in table tennis
World Table Tennis Championships medalists
Universiade silver medalists for Japan
Universiade bronze medalists for Japan
Kinoshita Meister Tokyo players
Ryukyu Asteeda players
Youth Olympic gold medalists for Japan
Medalists at the 2013 Summer Universiade
20th-century Japanese people
21st-century Japanese people